Presunto is dry-cured ham from Portugal, similar to Italian prosciutto crudo or Spanish jamón. Among the wide variety of presuntos in Portugal, the most famous are presunto from Chaves, produced in the north of Portugal, and that from the Alentejo, in the south, made from local Alentejano pigs.

Several varieties of presunto are protected by European law with geographical indications.

Etymology
The word is from Vulgar Latin past participle persunctus, ultimately from the verb sugo, 'to suck', and is unrelated to identical words in Italian and Spanish coming from the also past participle praesumptus, ultimately from sumo, 'to (under)take, occupy' (see wikt:presunto).

Presunto PDO and IGP 
In March 2014,  six varieties of presunto were protected by European law registered with protected designation of origin:
 Presunto de Barrancos (PGO) 
Presunto do Alentejo and Paleta do Alentejo (PDO)
 Presunto de Barroso (PGI)
 Presunto de Campo Maior e Elvas and Paleta de Campo Maior e Elvas (PGI)
 Presunto de Santana da Serra and Paleta de Santana da Serra (PGI)
 Presunto de Vinhais or Presunto Bísaro de Vinhais (PGI)

See also

 List of Portugal food and drink products with protected status
 List of hams
 List of dried foods

References

External links

Portuguese cuisine
Lunch meat
Ham
Dried meat
Portuguese products with protected designation of origin
Smoked meat